Association of Municipalities and Towns of Slovenia (SOS) was established in 1992 and is the biggest representative association of the municipalities of Slovenia. The association has 167 member municipalities (from 212 municipalities) and with this it covers nearly 90% of the inhabitants of Slovenia.

SOS is a member of the Network of Associations of Local Authorities of South-East Europe (NALAS)

Organization
Because of different needs in association with community's size the association is organized in three sections – section of city municipalities, section with Administrative Unit headquarters and section of other communities. President of each section is also a vice-president of the Association. Member municipalities represent and accomplish their tasks in 11 work groups and commissions, as well as in 15 work groups of association (440 representatives of member communities are operating in this groups), in which they coordinate legal acts and regulation act within working areas that are important for the communities.

The highest executive body of association is the presidency, composed of 25 mayors, 7 from each section.
President: Franc Kagler, mayor of the Municipality of Maribor
Vice-president: Irena Majcen, mayor of the Municipality of Slovenska Bistrica
Vice-president: Bojan Šrot, mayor of the Municipality of Celje
Vice-president: Anton Peršak, mayor of the Municipality of Trzin

Services for the members of the community
Tasks of Association of Municipalities and Towns of Slovenia are, in particular, implementation and representation of local community's common interests in proportion to coordination with legal and regulation acts, which, with their solutions, impact on municipalities’ situation. Among this, there are many other tasks, inter alia: 
 They draw up and carry out different types of education for member communities
 It offers help and scientific advice to the member communities in those fields where it is necessary
 It gives effect and it represents common interests of the community towards the state authorities and international organizations
 It creates common development projects
 It represents community's interests in the negotiations for financial credits intended for the community's from state budget
 It represents community's interests in the procedures of making collective contract for public sector
 It prepares professional materials for the community's needs
 It takes care of member community's regular informing, about issues, that are important for the community's functioning

See also
 Network of Associations of Local Authorities of South-East Europe
 Committee of the Regions
 Council of European Municipalities and Regions

References

 https://web.archive.org/web/20101112022036/http://www.skupnostobcin.si/zgmenu/english/general_about_sos/index.html
 http://www.stat.si/popis2002/en/

External links
 Official website of Association of Municipalities and Towns of Slovenia (SOS)
 Member Municipalities of SOS
 Partners of the Association of Municipalities and Towns of Slovenia (SOS)

 
Local government organizations
Council of European Municipalities and Regions
1992 establishments in Slovenia
Organizations established in 1992